Hedong Township, formerly known as Hedong Korean Ethnic Township, is a township under the administration and in the northeastern suburbs of Shangzhi in southern Heilongjiang province, China, located  from downtown. , it has nine villages under its administration.

References 

Township-level divisions of Heilongjiang
Shangzhi
Korean diaspora in China
Ethnic townships of the People's Republic of China